Jin Xuan (pronounced ) is a variety of oolong tea developed in 1980. The tea is also known as #12 or as "Milk Oolong" (Nai Xiang). It originates from Taiwan. The taste is light, creamy, and flowery and sometimes compared to milk. This tea variety can be grown at higher altitudes, and the yield is about 20% higher compared to traditional tea varieties. These circumstances made it one of the most popular varieties among tea farmers in Taiwan and Thailand. While genuine Jin Xuan naturally tastes milky, some producers produce artificial Jin Xuan through additives.

Contrary to myth, the flavoring of the leaves to accentuate their characteristic buttery taste is not obtained through steeping or steaming them in milk before roasting. Given that this quality is varietally endemic to the tea, the taste enhancement is simply produced by extra oxidization. Reputable dealers usually declare whether it is a natural or flavored oolong. A flavored Jin Xuan can be recognized before the tea is steeped. The added flavors mask the natural tea flavor significantly.

See also

 Oolong
 Taiwanese tea

References

Taiwanese tea
Oolong tea